Siopa longicornis is a species of ulidiid or picture-winged fly in the genus Siopa of the family Ulidiidae.

References

Ulidiidae